In Japan, Sanyo (Hepburn spelling: San'yō) can refer to:
Sanyo Electric Co., Ltd. (三洋)
Sanyo Shimbun, a daily newspaper
 Co., Ltd. (山洋)
.Co.,Ltd (サンヨー), an instant noodles manufacturer in Japan
San'yō region (山陽) near Seto Inland Sea, Japan
Sanyo Broadcasting
Sanyo-Onoda, Yamaguchi, a city in Yamaguchi Prefecture in Japan
San'yō Main Line, main railway line in western Japan
Sanyō Railway, the former operator of the Sanyō Main Line and its branches
Sanyo Electric Railway, a private railway company in Hyōgo Prefecture, Japan

See also
Sany